Staudach-Egerndach is a municipality  in the district of Traunstein in Bavaria, Germany.

Notable residents
 Therese ("Rosi") Brandl (190248), Nazi concentration camp guard executed for war crimes. 
Anna Kroher (18591943), folklore researcher and book author. 
Adolph Kroher (182592), cement factory founder and inventor of the first cement roof tile.

References

Traunstein (district)